North Teke, or Tɛgɛ (Tege, Teghe, Itege), is a member of the Teke languages dialect continuum of the Congolese plateau.

Alphabet

References

Teke languages